Philip Suriano (born 1948) is an American actor, best known for playing Dominic Santoro in Martin Scorsese's 1995 film Casino, based on real-life mobster Michael Spilotro. Another small but notable appearance by Suriano was in 1989's Lethal Weapon 2 (also with Pesci).

Besides Casino and Lethal Weapon 2, Suriano has had small roles in other films, such as Goodfellas (again with Pesci), Jane Austen's Mafia!, and Ocean's Eleven.

Filmography

External links

1948 births
Living people
American male film actors